The Aulikara Empire was a short-lived power founded by Yashodharman of Malwa, who belonged to the Aulikara dynasty. It was centred around the Malwa plateau, bordered by the Brahmaputra River and the Indian Ocean in the east and west, and the Himalayas and Mahendra mountains to the north and south. The Aulikara Empire was ruled by the Second Aulikara dynasty.

Establishment
Aulikara rulers such as Adityavardhana and Dravyavardhana expanded their kingdom and one of their successors Yashodharman conquered vast territories from the Hunas and Guptas after the Battle of Sondani, defeating the Huna Chief Mihirakula around 528 A.D., thus establishing the short-lived Aulikara empire. Yashodharman's capitol was almost certainly Dashapura, probably established by Yashodharman though initially thought to have been Ujjayinī, which has since been disproven. Kingdoms such as the Later Guptas and Maukhari dynasty were their vassals.

Decline
Most of the empire disintegrated after Yashodharman's death. Nothing is known about the dynasty after his death, and Malwa was conquered by the Kalachuris of Mahishmati.

After the collapse of Aulikara power in Northern India, the Later Guptas and Maukharis began fighting for imperial supremacy.

See also
 Malwa
 Yashodharman
 Shiladitya
 First Aulikara dynasty
 Second Aulikara dynasty
 List of rulers of Malwa

References

History of Malwa